Night Beat is the tenth studio album by American singer Sam Cooke, released in August 1963 by RCA Victor.

The album title originated from late-night recording sessions by Cooke and a quartet of studio musicians in February 1963. It has been featured in "best-of" lists by contemporary music critics and regarded as one of Cooke's best.

Background
Cooke and his musicians—pianist Ray Johnson, organist Billy Preston (who was 16 at the time of recording), lead guitarist Barney Kessel, alternating drummers Hal Blaine and Ed Hall, bassist Cliff Hils and Clif White, and René Hall on rhythm guitar—cut Night Beat in three days during late-night recording sessions at RCA Victor Studios in Hollywood in February 1963. "I Lost Everything", "Get Yourself Another Fool" and "Trouble Blues" were laid down on February 22, with the group returning, sans Kessel, the following day to record "Nobody Knows the Trouble I've Seen", "Mean Old World", "Little Red Rooster" and "Laughin' and Clownin. The last recording session for Night Beat took place on February 25, when the same group, sans Hall and Kessel, reunited to commit "Lost and Lookin, "Please Don't Drive Me Away", "You Gotta Move", "Fool's Paradise" and "Shake Rattle and Roll" to tape.

Reception
According to a retrospective review by John Bush of AllMusic, "Saddled with soaring strings and vocal choruses for maximum crossover potential, Sam Cooke's solo material often masked the most important part of his genius—his glorious voice—so the odd small-group date earns a special recommendation in his discography". He speculated that had Cooke not died prematurely, "there would've been several more sessions like this, but Night Beat is an even richer treasure for its rarity." Al Kooper of Goldmine wrote: "This is intimate Sam Cooke and his favorite musicians having some genuine fun in the studio, with obviously no eye toward ramming up the pop charts ... Each song is like another moody painting always in the appropriate, tasteful frame."

The Guardian included it on their 2007 list of "1000 Albums to Hear Before You Die", writing: "[Cooke] brought a spiritual intensity to every cute mainstream confection he recorded, but his beautiful voice was never more mesmerizing than on this hushed and gracious final album."

Track listing
All songs conducted by René Hall.

Personnel
All credits adapted from The RCA Albums Collection (2011) liner notes.
Sam Cooke – vocals
René Hall – conducting, guitar
Clifton White, Barney Kessel – guitar
Cliff Hils – bass guitar
Sharky Hall – drums, tambourine
Hal Blaine – drums
Ray Johnson – piano
Billy Preston – organ
Dave Hassinger – recording engineer

Notes

External links
 Songs of Sam Cooke: Main Page

1963 albums
Sam Cooke albums
RCA Victor albums
Albums produced by Hugo & Luigi
Albums conducted by René Hall